The Blackburn and Over Darwen Tramways Company operated a steam tramway service between Blackburn and Darwen between 1881 and 1898.

History

The tramway was authorised by the Blackburn and Over Darwen Tramways Act of 1879.

The route started in the centre of Blackburn, and followed  Darwen Street, Bolton Road, then through Ewood, Earcroft, Hawkshaw, and terminating in Darwen at Whitehall.

Six steam trams were acquired from Kitson and Company for the inauguration of the service. This fleet was later augmented to 15, with 7 of the additional trams being obtained from Thomas Green & Son.

The initial passenger cars were built by Ashbury on Eades patent reversible trucks. The seating capacity was 20 in the lower saloon and 26 on top. Later passenger cars were obtained from G.F. Milnes & Co. of Birkenhead.

The service came into operation after inspection from General Hutchinson of the Board of Trade.

Closure

The company was acquired by Blackburn Corporation for £22,337 (equivalent to £ in )  and Darwen Corporation for £26,163 (equivalent to £ in )  on 31 December 1898. Steam tram services continued until 1901.

References

Tram transport in England
3 ft 6 in gauge railways in England
History of Blackburn with Darwen
Transport in Blackburn with Darwen
Darwen
Historic transport in Lancashire